Laran-e Olya (also Romanized as Larān-e ‘Olyā and Lārān-e ‘Olyā) is a village in Shiveh Sar Rural District, Bayangan District, Paveh County, Kermanshah Province, Iran. At the 2006 census, its population was 126, in 28 families.

References 

Populated places in Paveh County